Hindupur mandal is one of the 54 mandals in Anantapur district of the Indian state of Andhra Pradesh. It is administered under Penukonda revenue division and its headquarters are located at Hindupur The mandal is bounded by Somandepalle, Chilamathur, Lepakshi and Parigi mandals, with a portion of it also bordering the state of Karnataka.

Towns and villages 

 census, the mandal has 15 settlements. It includes, 1 town and 14 villages.

Members Zilla Panchayat Territorial Constitutency (ZPTC's)

See also 
List of mandals in Andhra Pradesh

References

Mandals in Anantapur district